William ( – 15 July 1406), known as William the Courteous, a member of the House of Habsburg and Wilhelm, was Duke of Austria from 1386. As head of the Leopoldian line, he ruled over the Inner Austrian duchies of Carinthia, Styria and Carniola as well as the County of Tyrol and Further Austria from 1396 until his death.

Biography 
Born in Vienna, William was the oldest son of Duke Leopold III of Austria (1351–1386) and his consort Viridis Visconti (1352–1414), a daughter of Lord Bernabò of Milan. Leopold III had already acted as regent over the Tyrol and the Further Austrian possessions in Swabia; in 1379 he signed the Treaty of Neuberg with his elder brother Duke Albert III, whereupon he also received the Inner Austrian lands.

At the age of 8, William was betrothed to the Anjou princess Hedwig (Jadwiga; 1373–1399), the youngest daughter of King Louis I of Hungary, who had also become King of Poland in 1370. This was one of the first attempts of the Habsburgs to extend their dominions by marrying heiresses, as Louis intended his elder daughter Mary and her fiancé Sigismund of Luxembourg to succeed in Poland, while Jadwiga was designated heir to the Kingdom of Hungary. When King Louis died in 1382, Mary succeeded in Hungary. However, the Polish nobles rejected Mary and Sigismund, and instead chose Jadwiga as queen regnant. They also repudiated her betrothal to William and enforced the break-up of the engagement.
The Polish lords did not want to accept Jadwiga's fourteen-year-old fiancé, William of Habsburg, as their sovereign. They thought that the inexperienced William and his Austrian kinsmen could not safeguard Poland's interests against its powerful neighbours, especially the Luxemburgs which controlled Bohemia and Brandenburg, and had a strong claim on Hungary. According to Halecki, the lords of Lesser Poland were the first to suggest that Jadwiga should marry the pagan duke Jogaila of Lithuania.

Jogaila sent his envoysincluding his brother, Skirgaila, and a German burgher from Riga, Hanul to Kraków to request Jadwiga's hand in January 1385. Jadwiga refused to answer, stating only that her mother would decide. Jogaila's two envoys left for Hungary and met Queen Elizabeth. She informed them that "she would allow whatever was advantageous to Poland and insisted that her daughter and the prelates and nobles of the Kingdom had to do what they considered would benefit Christianity and their kingdom", according to Jan Długosz's chronicle. The nobles from Kraków, Sandomierz and Greater Poland assembled in Kraków in June or July and the "majority of the more sensible" voted for the acceptance of Jogaila's marriage proposal.

In the meantime, William's father, Leopold III hurried to Buda in late July 1385, demanding the consummation of the marriage between William and Jadwiga before 16 August. Queen Elizabeth confirmed the previous agreements about the marriage, ordering Vladislaus II of Opole to make preparations for the ceremony. According to canon law, Jadwiga's marriage sacrament could only be completed before her twelfth birthday if the competent prelate testified her precocious maturity. Demetrius, Archbishop of Esztergom, issued the necessary document. William went to Kraków in the first half of August, but his entry to Wawel Castle was barred. Długosz states that Jadwiga and William would only be able to meet in the nearby Franciscan convent.

Contemporary or nearly contemporaneous records of the completion of the marriage between William and Jadwiga are contradictory and unclear. The official accounts of the municipal authorities of Kraków record that on 23 August 1385 an amnesty was granted to the prisoners in the city jail on the occasion of the celebration of the Queen's marriage. On the other hand, a contemporary Austrian chronicle, the Continuatio Claustroneubuzgis states that the Poles had tried to murder William before he consummated the marriage. In the next century, Długosz states that William was "removed in a shameful and offensive manner and driven from the castle" after he entered "the Queen's bedchamber"; but the same chronicler also mentions that Jadwiga was well aware that "many people knew  she had for a fortnight shared her bed with Duke William and that there had been physical consummation".

On the night when William entered the queen's bedchamber, a group of Polish noblemen broke into the castle, forcing William to flee, according to Długosz. After this humiliation, Długosz continues, Jadwiga decided to leave Wawel and join William, but the gate of the castle was locked. She called for "an axe and [tried] to break it open", but Dymitr of Goraj convinced her to return to the castle. Oscar Halecki says that Długosz's narrative "cannot be dismissed as a romantic legend"; Robert I. Frost writes that it is a "tale, almost certainly apocryphal". There is no doubt, however, that William of Austria was forced to leave Poland.

In 1386, Leopold III was killed in the Battle of Sempach. William and his brother Leopold IV succeeded him as Duke of Austria, ruling jointly with their uncle Albert III. A fierce inheritance dispute arose when Duke Albert III died in 1395 and was succeeded by his only son Albert IV, William's first cousin. An agreement was reached in the following year, based on the 1379 Treaty of Neuberg, whereupon William left the rule over Austria proper to Albert IV and, as eldest members of the Habsburg Leopoldian line, went on to rule over the three Inner Austrian duchies and the County of Tyrol taking his residence in Graz.

In 1401, William married another presumptive heiress, Princess Joanna of Naples, Hedwig's cousin and also of Angevin descent. The marriage did not produce any offspring and William did not live to see his wife succeed her brother Ladislaus of Naples as Queen Joanna II in 1414.

In 1404, his cousin Albert IV died, leaving the lands of the elder Albertinian line to his seven-year-old son Duke Albert V. William acted as an Austrian regent and again tried to take the Albertinian territories from his minor nephew, but did not succeed before his death.

William died in 1406 without heirs in Vienna. He is buried in the Ducal Crypt in Vienna's St. Stephen's Cathedral. Upon his death, another division of the Habsburg hereditary lands took place, whereafter William's brother Leopold IV took over the regency in Austria proper, the third-born Ernest the Iron inherited the Inner Austrian duchies, and Frederick IV, the youngest, Tyrol and Further Austria.

Ancestors

References

Sources
 

 
 

1370s births
1406 deaths
14th-century dukes of Austria
15th-century dukes of Austria
Dukes of Styria
Dukes of Carinthia
Counts of Tyrol
Dukes of Carniola
Burials at St. Stephen's Cathedral, Vienna